A colonial empire is a collective of territories (often called colonies), either contiguous with the imperial center or located overseas, settled by the population of a certain state and governed by that state.

Before the expansion of early modern European powers, other empires had conquered and colonized territories, such as the Roman Empire in Iberia, or the Chinese in what is now South China. Modern colonial empires first emerged with a race of exploration between the then most advanced European maritime powers, Portugal and Spain, during the 15th century. The initial impulse behind these dispersed maritime empires and those that followed was trade, driven by the new ideas and the capitalism that grew out of the European Renaissance. Agreements were also made to divide the world up between them in 1479, 1493, and 1494. European imperialism was born out of competition between European Christians and Ottoman Muslims, the latter of which rose up quickly in the 14th century and forced the Spanish and Portuguese to seek new trade routes to India, and to a lesser extent, China.

Although colonies existed in classical antiquity, especially amongst the Phoenicians and the ancient Greeks who settled many islands and coasts of the Mediterranean Sea, these colonies were politically independent from the city-states they originated from, and thus did not constitute a colonial empire.  This paradigm shifted by the time of the Ptolemaic Empire, the Seleucid Empire, and the Roman Empire.

History

European colonial empires 

Portugal began establishing the first global trade network and one of the first colonial empires under the leadership of Henry the Navigator. The empire spread throughout a vast number of territories distributed across the globe (especially at one time in the 16th century) that are now parts of 60 different sovereign states. Portugal would eventually control Brazil, territories such as what is now Uruguay and some fishing ports in north, in the Americas; Angola, Mozambique, Portuguese Guinea, and São Tomé and Príncipe (among other territories and bases) in the North and the Subsaharan Africa; cities, forts or territories in all the Asian subcontinents, as Muscat, Ormus and Bahrain (amongst other bases) in the Persian Gulf; Goa, Bombay and Daman and Diu (amongst other coastal cities) in India; Portuguese Ceylon; Malacca, bases in Southeast Asia and Oceania, as Makassar, Solor, Banda, Ambon and others in the Moluccas, Portuguese Timor; and the granted entrepôt-base of Macau and the entrepôt-enclave of Dejima (Nagasaki) in East Asia, amongst other smaller or short-lived possessions. 

During its Siglo de Oro, the Spanish Empire had possession of Mexico, South America, the Philippines, all of southern Italy, a stretch of territories from the Duchy of Milan to the Netherlands, Luxembourg, and Belgium, parts of Burgundy, and many colonial settlements in the Americas, Africa, and Asia. Possessions in Europe, Africa, the Atlantic Ocean, the Americas, the Pacific Ocean, and East Asia qualified the Spanish Empire as attaining a global presence. From 1580 to 1640 the Portuguese Empire and the Spanish Empire were conjoined in a personal union of its Habsburg monarchs during the period of the Iberian Union, but beneath the highest level of government, their separate administrations were maintained.

Subsequent colonial empires included the French, English, Dutch and Japanese empires. By the mid-17th century, the Tsardom of Russia, continued later as the Russian Empire, the Soviet Union, and modern Russian, became the largest contiguous state in the world and remains so to this day.

Throughout the 19th and early 20th century, by virtue of its technological and maritime supremacy, the British Empire steadily expanded to become by far the largest empire in history; at its height ruling over a quarter of the Earth's land area and 24% of the population. Britain's role as a global hegemon during this time ushered in a century of “British Peace”, lasting from the end of the French Revolutionary and Napoleonic Wars to the start of World War I. During the New Imperialism, Italy and Germany also built their colonial empires in Africa.

Timeline

The chart below shows the span of some European colonial empires. 
 Black lines mark the year of the empires largest territorial extent of land area.
 Red represents that the empire is at that time a monarchy.
 Blue represents that the empire is at that time a republic.

List of colonial empires

:
  Belgian Empire (1908–1962)
  (1908–1960)
  Ruanda-Urundi (1922–1962)
 Belgian concession of Tianjin (1902–1931)
  British Empire (1707–1997/present)
 Evolution of the British Empire;  English colonial empire (1585–1707)
 Possessions in Europe
  British Cyprus
  British Malta
  British Ireland
  United States of the Ionian Islands
Possessions in Africa
  British Somaliland (1884–1960)
  British Egypt (1914–1936)
  Anglo-Egyptian Sudan (1899–1956)
  East Africa Protectorate (1895–1920)
  Kenya Colony (1920–1963)
  Uganda Protectorate (1894–1962)
  Tanganyika (territory) (1922–1961)
  Protectorate of Nyasaland (1893–1964)
  Protectorate of Northern Rhodesia (1924–1964)
  Colony of Southern Rhodesia (1923–1965), (1979–1980)
 Bechuanaland Protectorate (1885–1966)
  British Nigeria (1914–1954)
  British Gold Coast (1867–1957)
  British Sierra Leone (1808–1961)
  British Gambia (1821–1965)
 Possessions in the Americas
 
  British West Indies
 Bahamas
  Barbados
 
  (1671–1816),(1833–1958)
  (1833–1960)
 
  Colony of Jamaica (1655–1962)
  Trinidad and Tobago
 
  (1862–1981)
  (1814–1966)
  Mosquito Coast (1638–1787), (1844–1860)
Possessions in South Asia
  (1757–1858)
 
  Bombay Presidency
  Madras Presidency
  (1858–1947)
  (1815–1948)
  (protectorate) (1907–1947)
  Sikkim (protectorate) (1861–1947)
  Kingdom of Nepal (protectorate) (1816–1923)
 Possessions in East Asia
  (1841–1997)
 Possessions in the Middle East
  (1820–1971)
  British Bahrain
  British Qatar (1916–1971)
  British Iraq (1920–1932)
  (1921–1946)
  (1920–1948)
  Sheikhdom of Kuwait (1899–1961)
  Aden Protectorate (1872–1963)
  Muscat and Oman (1892–1970)
  (protectorate) (1879–1919)
 Possessions in Southeast Asia
 British Bencoolen
 British Malaya
 British Borneo
 Dominions of the United Kingdom
 
 
  States and territories of Australia (1901–present)
 Australia itself a colony that gradually increased its independence in 1901, 1942 and 1986, was tasked with the government of multiple other British colonies and territories and the mandates of New Guinea and Nauru
  Realm of New Zealand (1907–present)
 New Zealand itself a colony that gradually increased its independence in 1907, 1947 and 1986, was tasked with the government of multiple other British colonies and territories and the mandate of Samoa. It was also nominal co-trustee of the mandate of Nauru. The remaining non-self-governing New Zealand territory is Tokelau.
 Mandates under South African administration (1915–1990)
 The South-West Africa mandate was governed by the Union of South Africa, that itself a colony that gradually increased its independence in 1910, 1931 and 1961.
  Danish Empire (1620–1979/present)
  Danish India (1620–1869)
  Danish Gold Coast (1658–1850)
 Danish colonization of the Americas:
  Danish West Indies (1754–1917)
  Greenland (1814–1979)
  Dutch Empire (1602–1975/Present)
 Dutch colonization of the Americas by :
 
  Dutch Guyana/Surinam
  Dutch Brazil
  Dutch Caribbean
  Dutch Gold Coast (1612-1872)
 
  Dutch India
 
 
  Dutch Cape Colony (1652–1806)
  Dutch Formosa (1624–1662)
  Dutch Ceylon (1640-1796)
  Dejima (1641–1854)
  Dutch Mauritius (1638–1710)
  French Empire (1534–1980/present)
 French colonization of the Americas:
 France Antarctique (1555–1567)
  (1534–1763) and Quebec
  French Louisiana
  French West Indies (1635–today)
 Îles des Saintes (1648–present)
 Marie-Galante (1635–present)
 la Désirade (1635–present)
 Guadeloupe (1635–present)
 Martinique (1635–present)
 French Guiana
 
 Asia:
 French India (1664–1962)
  French Indochina and French Indochinese Union (1887–1954)
 Laos (protectorate) (1893–1953)
 Cambodia (protectorate) (1863–1953)
 Vietnam
 Cochinchina (Southern Vietnam) (1858–1949)
 Annam (protectorate) (Central Vietnam) (1883–1949)
 Tonkin (protectorate) (Northern Vietnam) (1884–1949
 China
 The foreign concessions : French Concession of Shanghai (1849–1946), Tianjin (1860–1946) and Hankou (1898–1946)
 The spheres of French influence officially recognized by China on the provinces of Yunnan, Guangxi, Hainan, and Guangdong
 Shamian Island (1859–1949) (a fifth of the island)
  French Guangzhouwan(1898–1945)
 Possessions in the Middle East
 Mandate for Syria and Lebanon (1920–1946)
 French Africa:
 French North Africa (1830–1934) and French Algeria
 French Morocco (1912–1956)
 French Tunisia (1886–1956)
 French Somaliland (1883–1967)
 French West Africa (1895–1958)
 French Madagascar (1897–1958)
 French Comoros (1866–1968)
 French Equatorial Africa (1910–1958)
 Isle de France (1715–1810)
 Seychelles (1756–1810)
 The Scattered Islands 
 Reunion island (1710–present)
 Mayotte (1841–present)
 Oceania:
  (1906–1980)
 
 
 
 Clipperton island
  German Empire (1884–1920)
  Kamerun (1884–1918)
  Togoland (1884–1916)
  German South West Africa (1884–1919)
  German New Guinea (1884–1919)
  German East Africa (1885–1919)
  German Samoa (1900–1920)
 German Concession in Tientsin
 German concession of Hankou
 German Tsingtao
 German Kiautschou Bay Leased Territory
  Italian Empire (1882–1960)
  Eritrea (1882–1947)
  Somaliland (1889–1947, 1950–1960 as Italian Trust Territory of Somaliland)
  Ethiopia (1936–1941)
  Italian East Africa (formed by merging Eritrea, Somaliland and Ethiopia: 1936–1947)
  Cyrenaica (1912–1947)
  Tripolitania (1912–1947)
  Libya (formed by merging Cyrenaica and Tripolitania in 1934. It dissolved in 1947. It also included the Southern Military Territory of Fezzan)
  Italian Islands of the Aegean (1912–1947)
  Italian Albania (1939–1943)
 Italian France (1940–1943)
  Italian Montenegro (1941–1943)
 Italian concession of Tientsin (1901–1947)
  Ottoman Empire (1354–1908)

 Europe:
  (1898–1913)
  (1475–1774)
  Ottoman Bosnia and Herzegovina (1463–1908)
  Ottoman Bulgaria (1396–1878)
  Ottoman Crete (1667–1898)
  Ottoman Greece (1453–1830)
  Ottoman Hungary (1541–1699)
  Ottoman Serbia (1371–1817)
  Rumelia Eyalet (1365–1867)
  Sanjak of Rhodes (1522–1912)
  United Principalities of Moldavia and Wallachia (1859–1862)
 Asia:
  Protectorate of Aceh (1496–1903)
  Ottoman Arabia (1517–1919)
  Ottoman Cyprus (1571–1878)
  Ottoman Iraq (1538–1918)
  Ottoman Syria (1517–1918)
 Africa:
  (1867–1914)
  Ottoman Egypt (1517–1914)
  Ottoman Absinia (1554–1872)
  (1516–1830)
  (1551–1912)
  Ottoman Tunisia (1574–1881)
  Portuguese Empire (1415–1999)
 Evolution of the Portuguese Empire
  Portuguese colonization of the Americas
  Colonial Brazil (1500–1815)
  Portuguese India (1505–1961)
  Portuguese Ceylon (1598–1658)
  Portuguese Timor (1702–1975)
  Portuguese Macau (1557–1999)
 Portuguese Malacca (1511–1641)
 Portuguese Nagasaki (1580–1587)
 Portuguese Oman (1507–1656)
 Tamão (1514–1521)
 Portuguese Africa
  Portuguese East Africa (1498–1975)
 Portuguese West Africa (1575–1975)
 Portuguese Guinea (1474–1974)
  Portuguese Cape Verde (1462–1975)
  Portuguese São Tomé and Príncipe (1470–1975)
 Fort of São João Baptista de Ajudá (1721–1961)
 Portuguese Gold Coast (1482–1642)
  Russian Empire (1721–1917)
 Siberia
 Caucasus
 Central Asia
 Russian colonization of North America:
  Russian America (1733–1867)
  Sagallo (1889)
 Russian Port Arthur
 Russian concession in Tientsin
  Spanish Empire (1492–1825/1898-1975)
 Spanish colonization of the Americas
  Viceroyalty of New Spain
  Viceroyalty of Peru
  Viceroyalty of New Granada
  Viceroyalty of the Río de la Plata
  Spanish East Indies (1565–1898)
  Captaincy General of the Philippines
  Spanish Africa
  Spanish Guinea (1778–1968)
  Spanish Sahara (1884–1975)
  Spanish protectorate in Morocco (1912–1956)
  Ifni (1476–1524/1859–1969).
  Habsburg Spain possessions in Europe:
   Spanish Italy (1535–1713)
  Spanish Netherlands (1535–1713)
  Swedish Empire (1638–1663, 1733, 1784–1878)
 Swedish colonies in the Americas 
  New Sweden (1638–1655)
  Swedish colony of Saint Barthélemy (1784–1878)
  Guadeloupe (1813–1814)
  Swedish Gold Coast (1650–1658, 1660–1663)
  Swedish Africa Company
  Swedish East India Company
  Parangipettai (1733)
  Swedish Factory, Canton Factories (1757–1860)

:
  Japanese Empire (1868–1945)
  Ezo as Hokkaido (1869–present)
  Ryukyu as Okinawa Prefecture (1879–1945 & 1972–present)
  Taiwan (1895–1945)
  Karafuto Prefecture (1905–1949)
   Korea (1910–1945)
 South Seas Mandate (1919–1947)
  (1932–1945)
  Greater East Asia Co-Prosperity Sphere (1932–1945)

:

  United States (1817–present)
 United States territorial acquisitions
 American Colonization Society
 Colony of Liberia (1821–1847)
 Philippines (1898–1946)
 United States Military Government in Cuba (1898–1902)
 United States Army Military Government in Korea (1945–1948)
 Ryukyu Islands (1950–1972)
  (1947–1994)
 American imperialism
 American Concession in Shanghai (1848–1863)
 American concession in Tianjin (1869–1902)
  Iraq (Coalition Provisional Authority) (2003–2004)
  Habsburg monarchy Colonies and the  Austro-Hungarian Empire (1719–1750, 1778–1783, 1901–1917)
 Austrian colonial policy
  Ostend Company
 Bankipur (Bengal)
 Covelong
 Austrian East India Company
 Austrian colonisation of Nicobar Islands (1778–1785)
 Austrian Delagoa Bay (1773–1781)
 Móric Benyovszky's Madagascar (1774–1779)
 Austrian North Borneo
 Franz Josef Land
 Austro-Hungarian concession of Tianjin (1901–1917)
 Hungarian colonial attempts
  Bulgarian Empire (1908–1946)
  Pirin Macedonia (1908–1918)
Western Thrace (1923–1944)
  Polish–Lithuanian Commonwealth (1637–1795) and  initiatives
  Duchy of Courland and Semigallia (a Latvian vassal of Poland–Lithuania in 1637–1690):
 Couronian colonization in Africa
 Couronian colonization of the Americas
 Jaxa (1665–1685)
 Toco (1688–1689)
 Colonization attempts by Poland 
 Polish occupation zone in Germany 
  German colonial initiatives (1683–1721)
 Colonies of  Brandenburg-Prussia (1683–1721)
 Colonies of  County of Hanau
 Neu-Askania (1828–1856)
 German colonization of the Americas
 Italy and the colonization of the Americas 
  Grand Duchy of Tuscany: Thornton expedition (1608–1609)
  Kingdom of Sicily: Kingdom of Africa (1135–1160)
  Knights Hospitaller (Malta, a vassal of the  Kingdom of Sicily): Hospitaller colonization of the Americas
  Norway
 List of possessions of Norway (1920–present)
 Erik the Red's Land
 Norway Antarctic and sub-Antarctic possessions (1927–1957)
  Sweden-Norway (1814–1905)
 Cooper Island (1844–1905)
  Kingdom of Scotland  (1621–1707)
 Scottish colonization of the Americas
  Kingdom of Morocco (1086–1228; 1975–present)
 Al-Andalus 
 Southern Provinces
  Omani Empire (1652–1892)
 Yaruba dynasty (1624–1742)
  Sultanate of Muscat (1652–1820)
  (taken by Oman in 1698, became capital of the Omani Sultanate or Empire from 1632 or 1640; until 1890)
 Mombasa (1698–1728, 1729–1744, 1837–1890)
 Gwadar (1783–1958)
 Chinese Empire (from Qin dynasty to  Qing dynasty),  (221 BC – 1911)
 Chinese imperialism
 Imperial Chinese Tributary System
 Guangxi
 Korea
 Canghai Commandery(A commandery that self subjugated to Han dynasty from Dongye)
 Four Commanderies of Han (Established after the fall of Gojoseon)
 Daifang Commandery (Offshoot of the former four commanderies of Han that existed in the 3rd to 4th century)
 Colonization attempts of the Tang dynasty after Unification of the three kingdoms of Korea (Gyerim Territory Area Command, Protectorate General to Pacify the East and Ungjin Commandery)
 Dongnyeong Prefectures, Ssangseong Prefectures and Tamna prefectures (Yuan dynasty)
 Hainan (since the Han dynasty)
 Nansha Islands
 Xisha Islands
 Manchuria (during the Tang, Liao, Jin, Yuan, Ming, and Qing dynasties)
 Inner Manchuria
 Outer Manchuria
 Kuye Island
 Inner Mongolia
 Outer Mongolia (during the Tang, Liao, Yuan, Northern Yuan, and Qing dynasties)
 Tannu Uriankhai
 Taiwan (during the Qing dynasty)
 Tibet (during the Yuan, Ming, and Qing dynasties)
 Yunnan
 Vietnam (during the Han, Xin, Eastern Wu, Jin, Liu Song, Southern Qi, Liang, Sui, Tang, Wu Zhou, Southern Han, and Ming dynasties)
 Xinjiang
 Central Asia (during the Tang, Western Liao, and Qing dynasties)
 Protectorate General to Pacify the West
  Ethiopian colonies as the Aksum Empire
 Viceroyalty of Yemen (520–578)
  Persian Empires
 Oman (5th century BC–628; 1743–1747)
 Bahrain (5th century BC–629; 1077–1253, 1330–1507)
 Sasanian Yemen (570–628)
 Aghlabids colonies as Arab vassals of   Abbasid Caliphate in Ifriqiya
 Southern Italy
 Emirate of Sicily
 Emirate of Bari
 Malta
  Chola empire
 Srivijaya
 Sri Lanka
  Kingdom of Siam
  Kingdom of Vientiane (1778–1828)
  Kingdom of Luang Prabang (1778–1893)
  Kingdom of Champasak (1778–1893)
  Kingdom of Cambodia (1771–1867)
 Kedah (1821–1826)
  (1799–1849)
  (1819–1846)
  (1834–1849)
 
  Liga Federal (1815–1820)
  Peru (1820–1822)
  Riograndense Republic (1836–1845)
  Juliana Republic (1839–1845)
  Gobierno del Cerrito (1843–1851)
  Tierra del Fuego
 Patagonia
  Falkland Islands (1829–1831, 1832–1833, 1982)
  Argentine Antarctica
  Misiones
  Formosa
 Puna de Atacama 
  California (1818)
  (1818)
  (1810–1816)
  Gonaïves, Haiti

 Clipperton Island
 Revillagigedo Islands
 Texas
 California
 Chiapas
 
 
 Chilean Antarctic Territory
 Chiloé
 Patagonia
 Arica and Antofagasta
 , 
 Cisplatina
 Acre
 Republic of Colombia
 United Provinces of New Granada (1810 - 1816)
 Department of Cundinamarca (1819 - 1831, would later become the remaining part of Colombia)
 Department of Venezuela (1820 - 1830, separated and became Venezuela)
 Department of Quito (1822 - 1830, separated and became Ecuador)
 Department of Panamá (1824 - 1903, separated and became Panama)
 Mosquito Coast (1819 - 1844, became a British protectorate)
 Archipelago of San Andrés Providencia and Santa Catalina (1818 - 1991, became a department of Colombia)
 Territories in the Amazon Region (1819 - 1991, became various departments of Colombia)
 Republic of Perú (1824 - 1827, during the presidency of Simón Bolívar)
 Republic of Bolivia (1825, during the presidency of Simón Bolívar)
 Republic of Spanish Haiti (1821 - 1822)
 Republic of the Floridas (1817, attempt to capture Florida)

Maps
European:

Asian:

Other countries with colonial possessions:

See also
 Analysis of Western European colonialism and colonization
 Colonial troops
 Democratic empire
 Empire
 Great Divergence
 Hegemony
 History of Western civilization
 Imperialism
 List of ancient great powers
 List of largest empires
 List of medieval great powers
 List of modern great powers
 Middle Eastern empires
 Nomadic empire
 The empire on which the sun never sets

Notes and references

External links
 Visualizing western empires decline

Empire
Empires